Patrick Carnegie Simpson (1865–1947) was a Presbyterian churchman. After being ordained in 1895, he served in several towns in Scotland and England, notably Renfield Church, Glasgow, and Egremont, Wallasey before being appointed in 1914 to the Chair of Church History at Westminster College, Cambridge. During the period leading up to the Scottish Church Crisis (1900–1905), he worked closely with Principal Rainy, his former professor at New College, Edinburgh, in his efforts to secure the union of the Free and the United Presbyterian Churches. In the post-World WarI period, he played a significant role in the area of inter-Church relations, particularly during the Lambeth Conversations and the Revised Prayer Book controversy. (See below) As an author, two of his books, The Fact of Christ (1900) and The Life of Principle Rainy (1909) earned widespread acclaim. In 1928, Carnegie Simpson was elected Moderator of the General Assembly of the Presbyterian Church of England. He retired from Westminster College in 1937.

Biography

Early years 
Carnegie Simpson was born in Horsham, Australia, in 1865. His father, the Rev. Patrick Simpson, in line with the evangelical commitment of the Scottish Free Church, had opted for missionary work in the newly settled colony, arriving in Australia in 1858. Ten years later however, shortly after the death of his wife and in declining health, he returned to Scotland. He died 5 years later. Simpson was raised with his brother and sister in the austere but secure atmosphere of Presbyterian observance at his aunt's house in Morningside, Edinburgh.

Education 
Carnegie Simpson was educated at George Watson's College and, in 1882, at the age of 17, was admitted to Edinburgh University to read for an M.A. in humanities. While at university, he participated in the social and political aspects of undergraduate life, graduating in 1885 with first class honours in philosophy. He spent the following summer semester at Heidelberg and, on his return, entered New College, Edinburgh, the theological Hall of the Free Church of Scotland, to prepare for the Ministry. It was a time of profound transformation in the Scottish religious, intellectual and social order due to the renewal triggered by the Disruption, the radical innovations in scientific thinking and rapid industrialisation. The transformation was characterized by a transition from the Calvinistic conservatism of the past towards a more flexible evangelical liberalism. The faculty at New College reflected this change and included among its staff, teachers such as Principal Rainy, A. B. Davidson, and Marcus Dods, who were in the vanguard of this new approach. After completing his studies at New Hall in 1890, and at the invitation of George Adam Smith, professor of Old Testament studies at Free Church College, Glasgow, Carnegie Simpson undertook an extended tour of the Holy Land, together with fellow student Charles Anderson Scott.

Ministry 
Following the tour, Simpson entered a probationary period of assistantship, first at St John's Free Church in Largs, Ayrshire, followed by Free St Andrews in Edinburgh. In 1894, he married Agnes Schmalz from Copenhagen and after a brief period of engaging in literary work for Sir William Robertson Nicholl, editor of the British Weekly, in London, was ordained in 1895 by the Presbytery of London South and inducted into the charge of Christchurch, Wallington. In 1899, Simpson moved to Scotland to become Minister at Renfield Church, Glasgow, one of the leading Free Church congregations, where he was to remain until 1911.

Renfield 
The years at Renfield were a period of intense ecclesiastical and creative activity. He arrived at the time of the Scottish Church crisis (See below) and inevitably found himself engaged in the turmoil of ecclesiastical politics. Two books that he wrote during this time, The Fact of Christ, and The Life of Principal Rainy, (See below) were particularly well received. While at Renfield, he also struck up a lasting friendship with James Denney who held the chair of New Testament Language and Literature at Free Church College, Glasgow. In 1911, however, Carnegie Simpson returned to England to become Minister at the Presbyterian Church of Egremont, Wallasey.

Westminster College Cambridge 
 
His ministry at Egremont was short-lived as three years later, in 1914, he was appointed to the Chair of Church History at Westminster College Cambridge, a post which he occupied until his retirement in 1937.

Post-war period 
During the 1920s, Carnegie Simpson was once more drawn into the arena of Church affairs. He was most notably involved in the negotiations arising from the Lambeth Conference, the Prayer Book Controversy, and the setting up of the Federal Council of the Evangelical Free Churches to foster cooperation between the nonconformist denominations. Carnegie Simpson became Moderator of the Federal Council of the Evangelical Free Churches of England in 1926 and 1927, and in 1928, he was elected Moderator of the General Assembly, the highest office and final court of appeal of the Presbyterian Church of England. Disappointed by the failure of the Lambeth Conversations after the 1930 Lambeth Conference, Carnegie Simpson played a decreasingly active role in Church politics in the 1930s. In 1937, at the age of 72, he retired from Westminster College. He was elected Professor Emeritus by the Presbytery of London North the following year. Carnegie Simpson died in Cambridge in 1947.

The Scottish Church crisis 
The opening years of the 20th century was a period of great unrest in the Free Church of Scotland. This was due to the discord, and at times vehement friction, between the majority, under the leadership of Principal Rainy who championed the movement for union with the United Presbyterian Church, and a small dissenting minority - later to become known as the "Wee Free Kirk". The minority, who were essentially from the Highlands and Western Isles, disapproved of the more liberal and evangelical interpretation of the Westminster Confession of Faith and claimed to be the sole authentic representatives of the Free Church. When the union between the Free Church and the United Presbyterians was finally proclaimed in 1900 (to form the "United Free Church") a lawsuit was filed by the "Wee Frees" disputing its legality.

House of Lords' ruling 
Although initially rejected in the Scottish courts, the suit was upheld on appeal by the 1904 ruling of the House of Lords. It was the confusion resulting from the dispossession of the United Free Church majority of the totality of the Church buildings, real estate and financial assets that constituted the "Scottish Church Crisis". The affair took on such proportions that the Government in Westminster finally considered it necessary to set up a parliamentary commission which resulted in the unprecedented "Churches (Scotland) Act" that overruled the House of Lords' decision and restored to the United Free Church all those assets that the minority were not able to use.

Ecclesiastical and academic career

The Scottish experience 
Carnegie Simpson moved back to Scotland in 1899 to take up his Ministry at Renfield just one year before the unification of the two Churches. It was a moment of troubled times and he found himself confronted with a situation of warring factions. He was immediately drawn into the debate in support of Rainy and, according to an editorial in the Journal of Presbyterian Historical Society of England, it was this experience that served as his apprenticeship in ecclesiastical affairs and as negotiator. His reputation spread rapidly. He became the youngest member to the Assembly's "Advisory Committee" which had been set up by Rainy to manage the situation and was called on to address meetings across Scotland and in London, to write pamphlets and articles for the press, and to negotiate with landlords to obtain land for temporary places of worship. During the same period, he carried several motions in the General Assembly and was also appointed to a number of other committees, including the committee set up (1909) to examine the issue of union between the Church of Scotland and the United Free Church which was finally realised by the Act of Union in 1929.

Return to England 
For Carnegie Simpson, however, this intensive involvement as author of Rainy's biography and in ecclesiastical politics was not the sort of engagement he had been seeking in the Church. Consequently, partly in order to escape from this, but also because the overload of work had meant, as he himself acknowledged, that he had not been able to satisfy his pastoral duties at Renfield as fully as he would have wished, he gladly accepted a Ministry at Egremont in 1911 that would allow him to devote himself more to pastoral work.

Teacher and academic 
In 1914, one month before the war broke out, Carnegie Simpson was elected by the Synod of the Presbyterian Church of England to the Chair of "Church History" at Westminster College, Cambridge. During the war period, teaching at Westminster was suspended and Carnegie Simpson carried out chaplaincy for the 1st Eastern General Hospital and was in charge of the congregation at St John's Wood, London.

It is not so much as a scholar that Carnegie Simpson is remembered but rather as a forceful teacher, less concerned with detailed historical analysis than in providing his students with a broad framework of the underlying essentials. According to Hay Colligan, Carnegie Simpson's professorship at Westminster was essentially characterised by a widening of the scope of the subject beyond the strict realms of Presbyterianism to a more global, historical view of "the general development of doctrine, dogma and polity."

Negotiator 
Despite his pre-war declared lack of enthusiasm for ecclesiastical affairs, Carnegie Simpson soon found himself drawn back into the world of Church politics and committee work. This proved to be an area in which he excelled and his skills as a negotiator and arbitrator are widely acclaimed. It is particularly for his efforts to foster greater cooperation and mutual understanding between the different denominations of the Church that his work is remembered. In the words of Professor Healey, it was what Carnegie Simpson did "beyond the strict bounds of the English Presbyterian Church, but in the realm of inter-Church relations that his impact was most significant."

Over the following 10 years, he played a prominent role in the following areas:

Federal Council of the Evangelical Free Churches 
In 1919 the Federal Council of the Evangelical Free Churches was set up to encourage cooperation between the different denominations. Carnegie Simpson assisted in the drafting of its constitution and was the chief author of the Statement of Faith. He was elected Moderator of the council for two consecutive years (1926 – 27).

Lambeth Conversations 
One of the outcomes of the maelstrom of WW1 was that it acted as a catalyst for change. In 1920, the Anglican Church launched the "Lambeth Appeal to all Christian People" proposing closer association with the nonconformist Churches and thus marking a fundamental change in attitude towards inter-Church relations. The Federal Council of the Evangelical Free Churches responded favourably to this ecumenical gesture and a committee was set up, chaired by Carnegie Simpson who drafted the reply - "The Free Churches and the Lambeth Appeal," - and participated with notable brio in the ensuing negotiations. As a result, strong and lasting ties, both personnel and inter-denominational, were made with the Anglican Church. These negotiations, however, finally turned out to be fruitless and were terminated in 1930. Carnegie Simpson expressed his disappointment at this outcome in a letter to The Times.

New Prayer Book  
In order to better meet the needs of the new century and because of growing incoherence and disparity in the use of the liturgical rites in the Church of England, a reformulation of the Prayer Book had become increasingly pressing. After 20 years of deliberation, the final version was presented to Parliament in 1927, generating intense debate. Insofar that the Church of England is the Established Church of the realm, the controversy became a question of national importance with direct implications for all the nonconformist denominations. There was fear of the current increasing ritualism, that the Reformation Settlement might be imperilled, while more extreme opinions evoked the danger of a return to "all the errors and horrors of Roman Catholicism". On 17 September 1927, Carnegie Simpson wrote a memorandum to the Ecclesiastical Committee pointing to the shortcomings and ambiguities of the text and the need for the Free Churches to obtain strong guarantees before approving it. In reply to this, Archbishop Randall Davidson invited Carnegie Simpson to Lambeth Palace where the memorandum formed the basis of the discussions between the various parties. Unlike the majority of the Free Churches, Carnegie Simpson was not fundamentally hostile to the project, believing that a satisfactory compromise could be found. However, this "Simpson position" did not, in the end, prevail and the project was finally rejected by Parliament on 15 December 1927.

General Assembly of the Presbyterian Church of England 
Carnegie Simpson became convenor of the Business Committee of the General Assembly of the Presbyterian Church of England in 1920, a post which he held for 11 years. His period of tenure was acknowledged as being particularly successful.

Moderator 
In 1928, Carnegie Simpson was elected Moderator of the General Assembly of the Presbyterian Church of England.

Presbyterian Historical Society of England 
Carnegie Simpson was a strong supporter of the Society from the time of its creation in 1913 and acted as Honorary President between 1925 and 1947.

Westminster College Memorial Chapel 
Carnegie Simpson served as intermediary between Sir William and Lady Noble and Westminster College with regard to the donation of the Memorial Chapel in commemoration of their son, killed on the Belgian front in 1915.

The author

Books 
Carnegie Simpson, is as has been already mentioned, especially noted for two of his books, both written in the early days of his career.

The Fact of Christ (1900) Carnegie Simpson's first book brought him immediately and durably into the limelight. It rapidly became a national and international success and was translated into at least seven languages. Between 1900 and 2012, there were 36 editions and readings from it were programmed by the BBC. The book, an apologetics in answer to the "rising assault of agnosticism", was based on a series of lectures given at evening classes in his early years at Renfield and aimed at "the honest doubter". The Fact of Christ avoids dogma and theology to focus on "the simplicity of Christianity and its emphasis upon life rather than orthodoxy …"

Contents: 1. The Data of Christianity - 2. What is the Fact of Christ? - 3. The First Meaning of the Fact: i) The Christian Character ii) The Moral Motive-Power - 4. The Further Meaning of the Fact: i) The Foundation of Faith ii) "And the Word was God" - 5. The Final Meaning of the Fact: i) The Reality of Sin ii) The Problem of Forgiveness. Addendum: The Principles of Atonement - 6. What is a Christian?

The Life of Principle Rainy (1909) In 1907, Carnegie Simpson was invited to write the biography of the recently deceased Robert Rainy, the most prominent figure in the Scottish Church at the time. Carnegie Simpson had known Rainy well, having studied under him for 4 years at New Hall and through their close collaboration during the Scottish Church Crisis. The two-volume biography of the man, considered by many as one of the charismatic leaders and founding fathers of the Free Church, is as Carnegie Simpson notes in the preface, "in many respects an ecclesiastical history as well as a biography". Amongst other things, the book discusses in length Rainy's role in the notorious heresy trial brought against Professor William Robertson Smith and the legal crisis triggered by the House of Lords' ruling in 1904 (See above) against the Scottish Free Church. The work received widespread academic acclaim and led to an honorary degree of D.D. from St Andrew's University.

Other publications of Carnegie Simpson include:

The Facts of Life in Relation to Faith (1913) In this sequel to The Fact Of Christ, Carnegie Simpson explores in greater depth some of the questions raised in his first book in relation to the political and social problems posed by the changing, modern world.

Contents: 1. The Creed of Experience - 2. The Indifferent World - 3. The Problem of Pain - 4. The Atheistic Fact - 5. The Reality of Christ - 6. The Claim of Humanism - 7. The Veto of Death - 8. The Comment of To-day

Church Principles (1923) Based on notes written to serve as guidelines for the presentation of the Free Church position during the long negotiations resulting from the Lambeth Appeal on Christian Unity, this volume reviews "the salient and guiding principles … of ecclesiastical life and order". The last chapter is more speculative and concerns the practical outcomes of considering the Church as a living entity.

Contents: 1. The Creative Fact - 2. The Visible Body - 3. People and Ministry - 4. Word and Sacrament - 5. Scripture and Creed - 6. Freedom and the State - 7. The Living Church

Westminster College Chapel, Cambridge. The Gift of Sir. W. J. Noble, Bart., and Lady Noble (1926) This monograph written in collaboration with Sir and Lady Noble and with descriptive notes by Carnegie Simpson commemorates the erection of the Memorial Chapel, funded by the Nobles, in memory of their son killed in WWI. The chapel is noted for its fine stained glass windows illustrating the Benedicite and designed by the Scottish artist, Douglas Strachan.

The Church and the State (1929) Here, the author gives a general overview, from the standpoint of the Free Church, of the evolution of the relations between civil and ecclesiastical institutions from New Testament times to the present day. It is written in the light of his experiences with Rainy during the Scottish Church Crisis and, as the dedication to Archbishop Davidson implies, the Lambeth conversations and the Prayer Book controversy.

Contents: 1. The War and the Peace - 2. The Established Religion - 3. The Pope and the Emperor - 4. The Seeds of Reform - 5. Reformation Settlements: i) German and Genevan ii) British - 6. The Growth of Toleration - 7. Modern Developments - 8. The Present Situation

Essentials: A Few Plain Essays on the Main Things (1930) This volume stands apart from the others as it is not aimed specifically at an audience of believers or the orthodox. It is more a general reflection on life and the lessons that are to be drawn from the human experience. He explores the role of work, love, happiness, suffering, friendship, the idealism of youth and the satisfactions of maturity. It is "the work of Simpson the Christian man rather than the Church historian."

Contents: 1. Introductory - 2. Love and Life - 3. Work and Life - 4. Why be Moral? - 5. Experience - 6. Belief in God - 7. Venit Hesperus - 8. Conclusion

The Evangelical Church Catholic. The Thirteenth Series of the Chalmer's Lectures (1934) This book is a reflection on some of the "capital elements in the character, structure, and function of Christ's Church as we find these exhibited and as we would see them developed …" In particular, the author examines the danger of "Ecclesiastical Materialism," that is to say, the tendency for the spiritual character of the Church to become obscured by the exterior structure.
(N.B. An American edition of this book was published (1935) under the title: The Fact of the Christian Church.)

Contents: 1. The Church, a Continuous Life - 2. The Religion of the Evangel - 3. Gospel in Word and Sacrament - 4. The Development of Doctrine - 5. Elements of Order and Unity - 6. The Evangel and Civilisation

Recollections - Mainly Ecclesiastical but Sometimes Human (1943): As its name suggests, this, his last book, is essentially autobiographical, except for the epilogue in which Carnegie Simpson returns to reflect on certain fundamental issues of life. It is generally lighter in tone, containing a profusion of anecdotes and insightful remarks on Church politics and the colleagues and personalities he knew. In so doing, the book reveals much about lesser known and more personal traits of the public man.

Contents: 1. Up to 1911 Scotland - 2. From 1911 England - 3. Epilogue i) The Validity of Faith ii) The Value of Life

Love Never Faileth (1902): Some mention should also be made of Carnegie Simpson's little known, second book, a rather unexpected and whimsical romantic novel. It was written, according to the author, during a summer holiday shortly after his marriage in "a slight effort…. to amuse my wife". This escapade into such a different realm casts an interesting light on the multiple facets of the very humane person behind the distinguished divine. Although the book's literary merits seem doubtful, Carnegie Simpson is sufficiently attached to it to afford it several lines in Recollections, even if his remarks are made with his characteristic, wry humour.

Short texts, papers, lectures … 
Carnegie Simpson edited and made contributions to a number of other books and a certain number of his more important conferences were published. See Bibliography below.

Letter writer, articles to the press 
Carnegie Simpson was a prolific letter writer and contributor to the general press, not only on strictly ecclesiastical questions but also in relation to more general, social problems such as: Living wages for miners, Nurse Cavell, The treatment of mental patients, The legitimacy of war, Marriage in the modern world, H.G. Wells, The atomic bomb and other subjects.

The man 
In a letter addressed to The Times in 1907, Carnegie Simpson appealed to readers to allow him access to personal documents to assist him in the writing of the biography of Principal Rainy. "A biographer", he explained, "must illustrate other aspects …. besides that of the public ecclesiastic" for, as he was fond of saying, "a man's career is one thing, and his life is another". Likewise, for Carnegie Simpson, over and above an account of the career of the eminent churchman, the talented negotiator and the successful author, it is necessary to make some attempt to portray the "inner man".

A question of style 
Hay Colligan in his appreciation of 1938 writes: " Dr. Simpson has that undeniable quality we call personality" and, in echo to this, Professor Healey titles his retrospective article in 1972, "Patrick Carnegie Simpson. A Man of Style." This question of style is first and foremost apparent in his writing and public speaking. Many of his contemporaries comment on, not only his command of language and his wide-ranging humanist culture, but equally the clarity of his arguments. Intimately linked to his public charisma are two other traits, namely his fairness in dealing with opposing opinions in debate, and his abiding sense of humour which played no small part in his success as a negotiator. Humour had more than a superficial place in his system of values. This "twinkling eye of truth" as he calls it, is one of the essentials if one is to keep "a balanced view of things". Even in his most serious academic writings, he cannot resist resorting to tongue-in-cheek commentaries. One of his favourite maxims, which hung framed above his desk, was:

 "Non es sanctior si laudaris, nec vilior si vituperaris. Quod es, hoc es; nec melior dici vales quam Deo teste sis."
 (Praise adds nothing to your holiness, nor does blame take anything from it. You are what you are, and you cannot be said to be better than you are in the sight of God.)

This may go some way to explaining why his wit is, at times, readily employed to point to any signs of pretension or self-inflation and, if required, could be scathingly caustic. This being said, by and large, his humour was mild and indulgent, not infrequently marshalled at the expense of the clergy and very often self-deprecatory.

Carnegie Simpson had, by all accounts, a remarkable zest for life. As he says in Essentials, "It is a good and great thing to travel through this wide and wonderful world". He delighted in the multifaceted nature of life, in the beauty to be found in the natural world and in literature, in the "saving idealism of the youth." He enjoyed challenge and action, and relished in the "cut and thrust" of discussion and debate. At the same time, however, Carnegie Simpson was, according to Professor Healy, "a profoundly religious man" as is reflected in his writings by his preoccupation with the eternal questions of the suffering of the innocent, of social injustice and of despair. Nevertheless, this did not prevent him delighting in a certain "mischievous irreverence", a shying away from the pitfalls of a too rigid obedience to any doxa. He makes it clear that he feels ill at ease with a religion that is too facile, too comforting, that sweeps away all doubts. One of his recurrent themes is that "religion cannot answer all the questions" and he insists that "even when a man who is counted religious, is only religious, he is incomplete". This dichotomy between belief and a necessary scepticism was mirrored in life by his well-known predilection for mixing in other than clerical circles.

Critical judgements 
While it is certain that Carnegie Simpson relished in the "Comédie humaine", enjoying, as Healey nicely puts it, the company of men and women of all sorts, "whether in Episcopal palaces or in public houses", the other side of the coin is that the arresting style and the high-profile stances that he adopted could not receive universal approval. The "Wee Frees" in no way subscribed to the position he took in the Scottish Church Crisis. Others complained that his search for compromise with the Anglicans and for Church unity did not reflect the opinion of the Presbyterian rank and file, and the obvious pleasure with which Carnegie Simpson narrates his encounters with the "Kalos k'agathos" (The beautiful and the good) and other worldly acquaintances was not always to everyone's taste; to some, such manifest urbanity was not quite appropriate. Others are critical of his lack of orthodoxy; a reviewer in Biblica Sacra talks of what he calls "an unwholesome steering away from accepted and tested modes of expression." Lumsden and the "Dictionary of Scottish Church History & Theology" regret a tendency towards hagiography in his most highly considered book, "The Life of Principal Rainy." Swanton is more severe, going so far as to suggest that Carnegie Simpson was "too closely identified with Rainy to evaluate his character and actions with the desired objectivity". Equally, on occasions Carnegie Simpson voiced opinions on ethical and political questions or indulged in sweeping generalisations which, with the advantage of hindsight, we may today consider with askance.

Family 
It was during a trip to Norway that Carnegie Simpson met his future wife, the daughter of a Danish Lutheran pastor, whom he married in 1894. Agnes Schmalz came from a very different background to the austere Presbyterian environment in which Carnegie Simpson had been brought up. She was a highly accomplished pianist and "Lieder" singer and accustomed to moving in cosmopolitan and artistic circles. One of Carnegie Simpson's earliest publications, a joint publication in collaboration with his wife, is a translation from the German dedicated to the life of Richard Wagner. They had one child, a daughter, Agnes Margaret Carnegie Simpson, who was among the pioneering generation of women doctors, qualifying from Edinburgh University in 1924.

Bibliography

Publications by Carnegie Simpson 
(Non-exhaustive list)

Books 

 (Note. An American edition of this book was published in 1935 under the title: The Fact of the Christian Church. New York: Fleming H. Revell company. )

Contributions to books, journals, conferences ... 
 Retrieved: 22 March 2015.

 1904. "Is there a Life after Death?" In: Questions of Faith: A Series of Lectures on the Creed. Ed. Carnegie Simpson. London: Hodder and Stoughton. 
 1904. "Samuel." In: Men of the Old Testament: Cain to David. Ed. George Milligan. London: James Robinson.
 1904. "The Mother of our Lord." In: Women of the Bible: Rebekah to Priscilla. Ed. Lewis, Howell Elvet, et al. Manchester: Robinson.
 1905. "Judas Iscariot." In: Men of the New Testament: Mathew to Timothy. Ed. George Milligan. Manchester: James Robinson. 
 1907. The Site of Union. Some Plain Words on the Establishment Question in the Scottish Church. London: Christian Union. OCLC - 314672569
  Retrieved 3 April 2015.
 1922, "Catholicity and Presbytery." (An address given at Bristol Cathedral at the invitation of the Anglican Church). In: The Lambeth Joint Report on Church Unity : a Discussion. London: Hodder and Stoughton. pp. 105–125. 
 1923. "Its Revelation in Christ." In: Christian Unity and the Gospel. Eds. Kenneth Ingham, Henry Wace, Carnegie Simpson ... London: Hodder and Stoughton.
 
 1927. "Continental Protestantism and the English Reformation." By Frederick J. Smithen. (Foreword by Carnegie Simpson.) London: James Clarke and C° Ltd. 
 1930. "Lambeth 1920 - A Free Church Presentation." In: The Call for Christian Unity: The Challenge of a World Situation. Eds. V.F. Storr, G.H. Harris. London: Hodder and Stoughton.

Articles in the general press 
 
 "The Struggling God." (Comments on H.G. Wells' "Mr Britling sees it through.") The British Weekly. (28 December 1916).
 "We must continue to love right more than peace..." (Report on a sermon) The Times. (18 December 1916).
 
 
 
 
  Retrieved: 22 January 2015.
 1935. "Distrust of Liberty". (A report on an address) The Times. (22 October 1935).

References 
 
 
 
 
 British History online. The City of Cambridge: Theological Colleges. Retrieved: 31 March 2015.
 
 
 The Cambrian News. (1927). cited by Maiden, 2007. Retrieved: 23 January 2015.
 
 
 Cheyne, A.C. (1996). New College, Edinburgh 1846-1996 - The Spirit of New College Retrieved: 31 March 2015.
The Churches (Scotland) Act. (1905). Retrieved: 17 April 2015.
 The Churchman (1928). Notes and Comments:   "Our Changing Church." London: The Church Society, Eliot Stock. OCLC - 750947240 .
 The Churchman (1929). "The Church and the State." p. 240  London: The Church Society. Retrieved: 28 March 2015.
 The Churchman (1935). Review of:  "The Evangical Church Catholic". London: The Church Society, Eliot Stock. Vol. 49 p. 145 OCLC - 750947240 Retrieved: 28 March 2015.

 
 
 
 
 Evangelical Free Churches (1921). The Free Churches and the Lambeth Appeal: being the report of a committee appointed by the Federal Council of the Evangelical Free Churches of England and the National Free Church Council. London: RTS. The National Council of the Evangelical Free Churches in England and Wales.
 Feinberg, Charles, L. (1936). Review of: "The Fact of the Christian Church". Bibliotheca Sacra. Vol. BSAC 093:369
 

 
 
 Horsham, Australia: The Historical Record of the Horsham Presbyterian Church. (1858 – 1908) p. 11
 
 Hunter, T.W (1902). Review of: "Love never faileth". The Chicago Daily Tribune. 28 June 1902.
 
 
 
 
 
 Mathews, Shailer (1901). "Review of: 'The Fact of Christ.'" The Biblical World, Vol. 18. University Press of Chicago. Retrieved: 11 March 2015.
 
 National Archives. Churches of Scotland Act (1905).
 Parliamentary Debates (Official Report). 69H. 5s, columns 972–973. Quoted in Martel, J.D.
 Radio Times. Schedules 1923 – 2009. BBC
 
  p. 25
 
 
 
 
 
 
 St James Gazette. 25 October 1904.
 
 The Times (1947). Obituary. London: 23 December 1947.
 
 The Tablet, (1901). Review of: "The Fact of Christ". 15 June 1901.
 
 
 
 "Who's Who in Australia 1921-1950". Herald & Weekly Times Ltd. Retrieved: 19 January 2015.

Notes

External links 
 Westminster College, Cambridge
 Works by Carnegie Simpson: Worldcat 

1947 deaths
1865 births
People educated at George Watson's College
Alumni of the University of Edinburgh
Presbyterianism in England